The Ruby Suns is the first full-length album released by the New Zealand based band The Ruby Suns. The band was originally called Ryan McPhun & The Ruby Suns and the album was released with this title in New Zealand on Lil' Chief Records. The album has subsequently been released in the UK on Memphis Industries in 2006 and in Australia on Popfrenzy in 2007 with different art, and the title truncated to reflect the band's new name. The 2007 Australian release of the album contains two bonus tracks, both of which are from a self-pressed single by the band in 2007.

Track listing

"Trees Like Kids" – 1:12
"Sleep In The Garden" – 1:43
"Maasai Mara" – 3:07
"Look Out Sos!" – 4:05
"Function of The Sun" – 1:10
"It's Hard To Let You Know" – 3:54
"Criterion" – 4:45
"Birthday On Mars" – 4:52
"Trepidation Part One" – 1:21
"Trepidation Part Two" – 3:30
"My Ten Years On Auto-Pilot" – 4:35
"There's Soup At The End Of The Tunnel" – 2:56
"Sister Brother (Australian release bonus track)" – 2:13
"Michi Ni Mayoimashita (Australian release bonus track)" – 1:15

External links
Lil' Chief Records: The Ruby Suns
Lil' Chief Records
The Ruby Suns on MySpace

2005 debut albums
The Ruby Suns albums
Lil' Chief Records albums